All Sports Stadium was a stadium located at the State Fairgrounds in Oklahoma City, Oklahoma. It had a capacity of 15,000 people and opened in 1961.

History 
While it was primarily used for baseball and was the home of Oklahoma City 89ers, it was also a popular outdoor concert venue in Oklahoma City. The 89ers baseball team was renamed to Oklahoma RedHawks and moved to AT&T Bricktown Ballpark in 1998. The stadium also hosted various college baseball events, such as Bedlam Baseball between the University of Oklahoma and Oklahoma State University and the Big Eight Conference baseball tournament for more than twenty years.

The stadium was closed in 1997 and demolished in 2005.

Concerts
A popular concert venue dating back to the 1970s, All Sports Stadium hosted a number of bands and musical festivals over the years. Here is a compilation of music events that occurred at the stadium over the years:

1984 

 July 12 - Beach Boys

1985 

 June 25 - Beach Boys
 August 13 - Jimmy Buffett

1986 

 June 9 - Beach Boys

1991 

 May 12 - Beach Boys

1998 

 July 1 - Lilith Fair, with Sarah McLachlan, Natalie Merchant and Sinéad O'Connor
 July 15 - The Smashing Pumpkins September 6 - Seven Mary Three

1999 

 May 29 - Sammy Hagar and the Wabos
 August 22 - Mötley Crüe, with opening acts Scorpions and Laidlaw

2000 

 June 2 - Stone Temple Pilots
 July 7 - Poison, Cinderella, Dokken and Slaughter

References

Sports venues completed in 1961
Sports venues demolished in 2005
Sports venues in Oklahoma City
Defunct minor league baseball venues
Defunct sports venues in Oklahoma
Baseball venues in Oklahoma
Music venues in Oklahoma
Demolished sports venues in the United States
1961 establishments in Oklahoma
2005 disestablishments in Oklahoma